Stephanie Bedwell-Grime is a Canadian author of fantasy, horror, science fiction, and romance novels. She has written more than a dozen novels and many pieces of short fiction. She has been nominated for the Prix Aurora Award five times.

Bedwell-Grime is married to Derek Grime, an artist in the field of animation and visual effects.

Published works

Angels
A set of contemporary tales set in Heaven, Hell, modern-day Toronto, and points in between.
 Guardian Angel
 Fallen Angel

Dark Fantasy
 Wishful Thinking
 Witch Island
 A Darker Passion
 The DeadWalk

Science Fiction
 Starr Struck
 Beneath a Million Stars

Vampires
 The Bleeding Sun
 Dark Desire
 A Pirate's Life
 The Vampire Next Door
 The Vampire's Kitchen

Romance
 Honeymoon for One
 Puppy Love
 Fair Game, Inc.
 Heartbeat

External links
 Official Site
 "Made in Canada" page
 publisher's author page

Canadian fantasy writers
Canadian romantic fiction writers
Canadian science fiction writers
Canadian women novelists
Living people
Women science fiction and fantasy writers
Women romantic fiction writers
Year of birth missing (living people)